The 2015 Progressive Skate America was the first event of six in the 2015–16 ISU Grand Prix of Figure Skating, a senior-level international invitational competition series. It was held at the UW–Milwaukee Panther Arena in Milwaukee, Wisconsin on October 23–25. Medals were awarded in the disciplines of men's singles, ladies' singles, pair skating, and ice dancing. Skaters earned points toward qualifying for the 2015–16 Grand Prix Final.

Entries

Changes to preliminary assignments
 On August 21, three out of the four host picks were announced as Ross Miner, Karen Chen, and Gretchen Donlan / Nathan Bartholomay.
 On August 26, the fourth host pick was officially announced as Anastasia Cannuscio / Colin McManus.
 On October 21, Gretchen Donlan / Nathan Bartholomay were replaced by Jessica Pfund / Joshua Santillan as Donlan / Bartholomay withdrew due to Donlan recovering from an illness.

Results

Men

Ladies

Pairs

Ice dancing

References

External links
 2015 Skate America at the International Skating Union
 Starting orders and result details

Skate America
Skate America, 2015
Skate America
Skate America